Avishag Semberg (or Abishag Samberg, ; born 16 September 2001) is an Israeli taekwondo athlete. She was an Olympic bronze medalist for Israel at the 2020 Summer Olympics in the women's 49 kg competition. She won Israel's all-time tenth Olympic medal, and is the youngest Israeli to receive an Olympic medal, at the age of 19.

Early life
Semberg was born and raised in Gedera, Israel, to Israeli parents of Ashkenazi Jewish descent and of both Sephardi Jewish and Mizrahi Jewish (Moroccan-Jewish) descent, Oren Semberg and Nili Cohen-Semberg. Her father is a lawyer.

In 2015, at 13.5 years of age Semberg participated in the third season of the Israeli The Kids' Channel reality game show The Boys and The Girls (HaBanim VeHaBanot), and was the ninth-eliminated contestant, the last one right before the finale where her girl teammates have won.

Semberg was conscripted to the Israel Defense Forces in 2020, serving as a soldier with the Home Front Command, where she was designated an "Outstanding Sportswoman" allowed time off to train and compete. She had an honorable discharge in November 2021 after completing her military enlistment.

She trains at the Sharabi Martial Arts club in Ramla, Israel, where Semberg resides as well, coached by Israeli trainer Yechiam Sharabi.

Career
In 2013, Semberg won a gold medal in the Israel Cadets Open in the 37 kg weight class in Ashdod, Israel, and in 2015 she won a gold medal in the Israel Cadets Open in the 44 kg weight class in Ramla, Israel.

In 2016 Semberg won a bronze medal at the youth World Taekwondo Championships in Burnaby, Canada, in the 46 kg weight class.

In 2017 she won a bronze medal in the European Youth Championships in the 46 kg weight class in Larnaca, Cyprus. That year she also won a gold medal in the Israel Senior Open in the 46 kg weight class in Ramla, Israel.

On 8 October 2018 she placed fifth at the Girls' 49 kg competition in the 2018 Summer Youth Olympics in Buenos Aires, Argentina. Also that year, she won a gold medal in the 2018 Polish Youth Open in the 49 kg weight class in Warsaw, Poland. In 2019 she won a bronze medal in the European Junior Championships in Helsingborg, Sweden, and gold medals in the Israel Senior Open and the Riga Senior Open, in the 49 kg weight class.

In 2020 she won a gold medal in the European Clubs Senior Championships in Zagreb, Croatia, in the 49 kg weight class.

2020 Summer Olympics – Olympic bronze medal
On 7 May 2021 Semberg qualified for the 2020 Summer Olympics in Tokyo, Japan, by winning the gold medal in the 2021 European Taekwondo Olympic Qualification Tournament.

Participating in the women's 49 kg for Israel at the 2020 Summer Olympics, Semberg beat Puerto Rican Victoria Stambaugh in the qualification round, before losing to Thai 2015 and 2019 world champion Panipak Wongpattanakit in the round of 16. With Wongpattanakit progressing to the final, Semberg got to compete in the repechage, where she beat 8th-seeded Trương Thị Kim Tuyền from Vietnam to qualify for the bronze medal match against Turkey's Rukiye Yıldırım, whom Semberg beat, 27–22, earning Israel's first Olympic medal (all-time, tenth) in the 2020 Summer games. Semberg is also the youngest Israeli to win an Olympic medal, at age 19.

Personal life 
Semberg is in a relationship with Israeli taekwondo athlete Nimrod Krivitzky since 2019.

See also
List of Jews in sports#Taekwondo
List of Israelis
Sports in Israel

References

External links
 
 
 
 
 
 

Israeli female taekwondo practitioners
Living people
2001 births
Olympic bronze medalists for Israel
Medalists at the 2020 Summer Olympics
Olympic medalists in taekwondo
Olympic taekwondo practitioners of Israel
Taekwondo practitioners at the 2020 Summer Olympics
Taekwondo practitioners at the 2018 Summer Youth Olympics
Sportspeople from Gedera
Sportspeople from Ramla
Jewish sportspeople
Israeli people of Moroccan-Jewish descent
Israeli Ashkenazi Jews
Israeli Sephardi Jews
Israeli Mizrahi Jews